, often shortened to Ameyoko  (アメ横), is an open-air market in the Taito Ward of Tokyo, Japan, located next to Ueno Station.

There are two theories on the etymology of Ameya. Even now, there are stores selling candy there. In either case, it is now commonly referred to simply as ameyoko.

The market is home to over two hundred and fifty shops, which sell products ranging from food to clothing and other merchandise.

References

Retail markets in Tokyo